Maximilian (also spelled Maksymilian) Cercha (1818–1907) was a Polish painter and drawer.

Life 

Cercha was born  in Kraków.

Among Cercha's students are his son, Stanisław Cercha, and Stanisław Tarnowski.

References

External links

1818 births
1907 deaths
Artists from Kraków
Draughtsmen
Polish painters
Polish male painters